Datuk Mohd Azis bin Jamman (Jawi: محمد عزيز بن زمان) is a Malaysian politician who served as the Deputy Minister of Home Affairs in the Pakatan Harapan (PH) administration under former Prime Minister Mahathir Mohamad and former Minister Muhyiddin Yassin from July 2018 to the collapse of the PH administration in February 2020. He has served as the Member of Parliament (MP) for Sepanggar since May 2018. He has served as the Information Chief of WARISAN since October 2022 and the 1st and founding Youth Chief of WARISAN from October 2016 to August 2022.

Elections

2018 general election 
In the 2018 election, his party, the then Sabah Heritage Party (WARISAN) fielded him to contest the Sepanggar parliamentary seat which was expected to be a marginal seat against Abdul Rahman Dahlan, the incumbent Minister in the Prime Minister's Department from the United Malays National Organisation (UMNO) and subsequently won.

Election results

Honours
  :
  Knight Companion of the Order of the Crown of Pahang (DIMP) – Dato' (2015)
  :
  Commander of the Order of Kinabalu (PGDK) – Datuk (2018)

References

External links 
 

1974 births
Living people
Malaysian Muslims
People from Sabah
Commanders of the Order of Kinabalu
Bajau people
Members of the Dewan Rakyat
Sabah Heritage Party politicians